The World University Orienteering Championships (WUOC) is a biannual orienteering competition organized by International University Sports Federation (FISU). Entry is open to athletes aged 17 to 25 who are enrolled in university either the year of or the year after the competition. Representative countries must be members of the International Orienteering Federation (IOF).

Format

The current championship events are:
 Relay – three-person teams (four-person teams until 2008)
 Long distance
 Middle distance
 Sprint
 Sprint Relay – four-person teams of two males and two females (added in 2014)

Host towns/cities

See also
 International University Sports Federation (FISU)

External links
13th WUOC 2002
14th WUOC 2004
15th WUOC 2006
16th WUOC 2008
17th WUOC 2010
18th WUOC 2012
19th WUOC 2014
22nd WUOC 2022
Hungarian orienteers on the World University Orienteering Championships
1974 International University Championships in Orienteering — Results
1986 World University Orienteering Championships — Results
1994 World University Orienteering Championships — Results
1996 World University Orienteering Championships — Results
1998 World Universities Orienteering Championships — Results
2000

References

Orienteering competitions
Orienteering